The Dollesbach is a small river in Baden-Württemberg, Germany. It flows into the Blinde Rot north of Adelmannsfelden.

See also
List of rivers of Baden-Württemberg

Rivers of Baden-Württemberg
Ellwangen Hills
Rivers of Germany